Nowbijar (also Romanized as Nowbījār) is a village in Layalestan Rural District, in the Central District of Lahijan County, Gilan Province, Iran. At the 2006 census, its population was 360, in 109 families.

References 

Populated places in Lahijan County